The Yurok are a Native American people of California.

Yurok may also refer to:
Yurok language, the Algic language of the Yurok tribe
Yurok Indian Reservation, in Del Norte and Humboldt counties, California
Yurok, or Yörüks, a Turkic ethnic group of Turkey and the Balkan Peninsula
USS Yurok, later the USS Bluebird, a tugboat converted into a submarine rescue vehicle

See also
Yuroke, Victoria, a rural town in Australia